St Andrew's College is a residential college for women and men within the University of Sydney, in the suburb of Newtown. Home to over 380 male and female undergraduate students, postgraduate students, resident Fellows and graduate residents.

The College, governed by its own elected Council, is situated within the campus of the University of Sydney. Set in its own picturesque grounds, it has offered residency, academic and social support to students for 150 years.

The College provides students with a combination of intellectual independence, academic support from the Residential Life team and personal development through involvement in Students’ Club activities such as a wide range of sporting, philanthropic and cultural activities and the gift of lifelong friendships.

The St Andrew's College Incorporation Act received Royal Assent in 1867 in the 31st year of the reign of Queen Victoria and was only replaced by an updated Act as recently as 1998. 1867 is therefore the date taken as the College's foundation, and in 2017 the College celebrated its sesquicentenary as Australia's third oldest university college. In 1870 the College Council first met and in 1876 the students entered the grand sandstone Scottish baronial building now known as the Main Building.

The College is a non-denominational independent institution of Protestant origins situated upon its own sub-grant of Crown Land and governed by a Council under the St Andrew's College Act 1998. Diversity of faith is genuinely welcome.

The College is one of Australia's most prestigious and selective university colleges, producing many notable alumni in the fields of business, law and politics. Known as Androvians, alumni have taken on leading positions in both public and private sectors of Australia. Examples include but are not limited to:   

H. V. Bert (Doc) Evatt (President of the United Nations), Andrew Constance (Politician), Angus Taylor (Politician), Craig Blair (Founder, AirTree Ventures), 

James and Robbie Ferguson (Founder, Immutable X), John Bradfield (Architect of Sydney Harbour Bridge), Rohan Browning (Athlete) and more.

History
St Andrew's College was incorporated by Act of Parliament and received Royal Assent from Queen Victoria on 12 December 1867. The St Andrew's College Act 1998 replaced the St Andrews Incorporation Act 1867. This change means the Principal may be member of the laity and the religious affiliation of councillors has been broadened to include all Protestants.
Adam Thompson became the first Principal of St Andrew's in 1872. He was a graduate of the University of Edinburgh who had come from his Hawick parish to Sydney in 1861.
The College Council first met in 1870 and the first 16 students began their studies in 1874, even before the Main building was completed in 1878. Increasing demand for places led to the opening of additions to the College in 1892 (Sulman Wing), and in 1907 and 1914 (Vaucluse extensions).  The student population increased to 140 in 1953 when the Reid building was completed, to 200 when the Thyne building was opened in 1966 and again to 272 when the Hanks Building was completed in 2007.

The College occupies 4 hectares of land within the main campus of the University of Sydney and was built on a sub-grant of University Land.

Whilst the Theological Hall of the Presbyterian Church in New South Wales, now the Presbyterian Theological Centre, was without home, St Andrew's College allowed its members to live at the College (until it relocated to Burwood in 1983).

In 2001, the College Council resolved to admit female undergraduates for the first time, with the first such students taking up residence at the commencement of the 2002 academic year.

Its motto Christo, ecclesiae, litteris is Latin for For Christ, for the church, for scholarship.

Every year, the College men compete for a sporting trophy, commonly known as the Rawson Cup, which was presented to the Sydney University Sports Union in 1906 by Admiral Sir Harry Rawson, and is the height of male intercollegiate sport. The cup is fought for throughout the year by men representing each of the University of Sydney Colleges accumulating points by competing in cricket, rowing, swimming, rugby, tennis, soccer, basketball and athletics. St Andrew's has enjoyed sustained recent success, winning the Rawson Cup in 2010, 2011, 2012, 2013, 2014, 2015 and 2016. St Andrew's has won the Rawson Cup more often than all the other colleges combined.

Since 2002, the College women have competed for their equivalent sporting trophy, the Macrae Archdale Cup, known as "The Rosebowl". The Rosebowl is contested by the five colleges that admit women. It consists of the sports of rowing, swimming, netball, hockey, tennis, basketball, soccer and athletics. The College won the Rosebowl for the first time in 2006, and also for the last nine years 2009, 2010, 2011, 2012, 2013, 2014, 2015, 2016 and 2017.

The College has had unrivalled success in the Palladian Cup, winning the annual inter-college performing arts competition in 2017 for the third time in five years, and more often than all other colleges combined since the Cup's inception in 2001.

St Andrew's remains the only college to have won the University Cup, along with the achievement of winning all 4 cups (Palladian, Rosebowl, Rawson, University Cup) in the academic year 2020 and 2022.

Principals

Heresy Conviction Controversy
Scottish born Peter Cameron was appointed Principal of St Andrew's College in 1991, and thus became a minister in the Presbyterian Church of Australia. In 1993 while serving as Principal, Cameron was convicted by the Presbyterian Church of Australia of Heresy. He was charged for disagreeing with the first chapter of the Westminster Confession of Faith (which as a minister of the Presbyterian Church of Australia, he was required "firmly and constantly to adhere thereto and to the utmost of [his] power to maintain and defend") by questioning the writings of Paul in the New Testament. The charge related to a sermon that he preached on 2 March 1992 called 'The Place of Women in the Church' to 300 members of a Presbyterian women's organisation. In the sermon, Cameron supported the ordination of women to the ministry, criticised the Church's hard line on homosexuality, and attacked fundamentalist Christianity in general (Jensen, nd) (de Maria, 1999)

Modern Controversies
The college, along with other University of Sydney colleges, has encountered a reasonable amount of criticism in recent years over student behavior and culture. Hazing has been a major target of media allegations. Alcoholism, sexism, and racist sentiments as well as a general attitude of entitlement have all been said to be part of the college's culture. In response to these allegations, The college responded to the Broderick Report with a cultural renewal plan (2018-2019), focusing in particular on hazing, alcohol misuse, sexual misconduct, and harassment. Despite this, there have been allegations that many of the same problems continue to exist at St Andrews. In May 2020 graffiti stating "nothing has changed" and "end rape on campus" appeared on the walls of the college in response to continued reports of hazing, sexism, and white nationalism. The college lambasted the defacement of heritage buildings, though acknowledged that "there is nothing unfair about the view that there is more work to be done and new issues to be investigated". In 2021 there were continued media accusations, with claims that the college featured an environment of privilege in which students were partying and disrespecting rules throughout the July COVID-19 lockdown. The student head of college reportedly called the inability to travel between home and college at will throughout the lockdown "stupid", stating that they would attempt to bypass the restrictions.

Today
St Andrew's College is home to 336 male and female undergraduate and graduate students and resident Fellows.  All of the undergraduate students are members of the Students' Club, and the Junior Common Room. These are governed by an elected body of students, the House Committee.

The College is also home to 22 graduate students. These students are members of the Senior Common Room. They contribute greatly to the College's extensive tutorial program which covers as many of the subjects the University offers as it can. Residential members of the Senior Common Room are allowed to compete for selection on the College sporting teams. There are also University academics who reside at the College and are members of the Senior Common Room.

Intercol
Intercollegiate competitions in sport and the arts are contested annually by the residential colleges within the University of Sydney.
Each St Andrew's success in Rawson, Rosebowl and Palladian events is celebrated by all students in the College with a Victory Dinner in the Dining Hall.
In 2013 and again in 2015, St Andrew's College made history by claiming all four Cups (Rawson, Rosebowl, Palladian and University) in the Intercol competition. 
In 2014 and 2016, St Andrew's took out the Rawson, Rosebowl and University Cups and placed 2nd in the Palladian competition.

Buildings 
At present, the College comprises 4 main buildings, as well as a number of smaller ones. "Main" is the oldest of these, and was extended with the addition of the Sulman and Vaucluse wings. Further extensions on Main were carried out in the 1960s, and now it not only houses 90 students’ rooms, but has the college's dining hall, library, reading room, Junior and Senior Common Rooms, administration offices, the Kinross-Mackie Chapel and a number of tutorial rooms. Main predominantly houses freshers and sophomores. "Reid" is the second oldest building, and was opened in 1953, when it was simply known as the New Building. It is typically home to both Sophomores and Seniors. The Thyne Building was opened in 1966, the same year as the College's oval was constructed. This building typically houses freshers and Sophomores. The Hanks Building (referred to by students as "New Wing") was completed in 2007; it is home to only seniors and above. The rooms in this building are much larger and all have bathrooms.

The College also has a number of smaller buildings, such as the Harper Lodge (where high-ranking members such as the Vice-Principal live), the Dougan Lodge (a.k.a. the Bird's Cage, where the Principal lives), the Old Laboratory (a.k.a. the Country Club, which houses graduates, and is next to the tennis courts), the Gatehouse and Sulman Wing (graduate housing).

Notable former residents

Politics
Current
 Angus Taylor, Shadow Treasurer and Member for Hume
 Alister Henskens, NSW Minister for Families, Communities and Disability Services

Former
 H. V. Bert (Doc) Evatt, Australian Opposition Leader, youngest ever High Court Judge and President of the United Nations
 Sir George Fuller, Premier of NSW
 John Mason, former Leader of the Opposition (New South Wales)
 Rob Oakeshott, Independent Federal Member of Parliament for Lyne
 Philip Lucock, Deputy Speaker of the House of Representatives and Member for Lyne
 Frederick Osborne, Australian Minister for Customs and Excise, Minister for Air and Minister for Repatriation and Member for Evans
 Garry West, NSW Minister for Police and Member for Orange
 Andrew Constance, NSW Minister for Transport and Infrastructure

Law
 H. V. Bert (Doc) Evatt, High Court Judge 
 Joseph Campbell, judge of the New South Wales Court of Appeal
 Alan Loxton AM, Former Senior Partner Allen, Allen and Hemsley
 Charles Waterstreet, Barrister, author and producer

The Sciences
 Gordon Childe, renowned prehistorian, philologist and archaeologist
 Raymond Dart, anthropologist
 John Bradfield, engineer and designer of the Sydney Harbour Bridge who received the first doctorate of science in engineering from the University

Medicine
 Cecil Cook, Medical administrator

The Arts
 Alex Cubis, actor and lawyer
A.D. Hope, Poet
 Mungo Wentworth MacCallum, Political journalist
 Bob Brissenden, Poet and Novelist
 Frank Walker, Journalist and writer
 Chris Brown, Television presenter

Theology
 Revd. Dr John Dunmore Lang, foundation Councillor 1870 - 1878. Lang was a prominent Australian Presbyterian minister, politician, activist, republican, and libelist.
 Revd. Dr Andrew Harper, former Principal
 Revd. Dr Samuel Angus, professor of New Testament and Church History, charged with heresy
 Peter Cameron, former Principal and convicted heretic
 John McIntyre CVO, Hunter Baillie Professor 1946–56, Principal 1950–56, Honorary Fellow 1990–2005, sometime Professor of Divinity and Principal of New College in the University of Edinburgh, Moderator of the General Assembly of the Church of Scotland, and Dean of the Order of the Thistle

Academia
 Professor George Arnold Wood, Foundation Challis Professor of History at the University of Sydney 1891-1928 
 Cecil Purser, Vice Chancellor of the University of Sydney 1917-1918 and 1923, Deputy Chancellor of the University of Sydney 1924-1925
 Sir David Gilbert Ferguson, Vice Chancellor of the University of Sydney 1919-1921
 Sir Percival Halse Rogers KBE, Chancellor of the University of Sydney, 1936–1941
 Robert C. Robertson-Cuninghame, Chancellor of the University of New England, 1981–1993
 Professor Clifford Blake, Vice Chancellor of Charles Sturt University, 1990-2001 and Vice Chancellor of the University of Adelaide, 2001-2002
 Associate Professor R. Ian Jack, Dean of the Faculty of Arts of the University of Sydney , Senior Fellow of St Andrew's College, Co-Founder of Historical Archaeology in Australia

Military
 Lt General Sir Iven Mackay, KBE, CMG, DSO & Two Bars, VD
 Group Captain Peter Jeffrey, Group Commander Royal Australian Air Force
 Brigadier Sir Kenneth Fraser, CBE

Sport

Rugby Union
Wallaby Captains
 Phil Waugh
 Nick Farr-Jones
 Dick Tooth
 John Solomon
 Arthur C. Wallace, also played 9 Rugby Tests for Scotland and coached the Wallabies 1937 and 1953
 Tom Lawton, Snr
 Alex Ross
 Bill Hardcastle

Other Wallabies
 Scott Gourley, dual international Rugby Union and Rugby league
 Marty Roebuck
 Bruce "Jackie" Beith
 Hugh Taylor
 Arthur "Huck" Finlay
 Duncan Fowles
 Johnny Taylor, dual international Cricket and Rugby Union
 Saxon White
 Myer Rosenblum
 David Brockhoff
 Nathan Charles
 David Fitter
 Otto Nothling, dual international Cricket and Rugby Union

Others
 Forbes Carlile, Olympic competitor 1952 Summer Olympics and Swimming coach of various Olympic swimmers including Shane Gould
 Johnny Taylor, Former Australian Test Cricketer and Wallaby
 Otto Nothling, Former Australian Test Cricketer and Wallaby
 Nigel Barker, Olympic athlete 1906 Athens Olympics holder of Australia's first athletics world record, in the 400 yards, and an Olympic Games bronze medalist in the 400 yards and 100 yards events.
 John Hudson, Olympic rower 1960 Rome Olympics
 Les McKeand, Olympic athlete 1948 London Olympics
 Glenn Kable, Olympic shooter for Fiji, 2004 Athens Olympics, 2008 Beijing Olympics, 2012 London Olympics and 2016 Rio Olympics
 Hannah Buckling, Olympic water polo player 2016 Rio Olympics
 Jaime Ryan, Olympic sailor 2016 Rio Olympics
 James Matheson, Olympic skier 2018 Winter Olympics
 Rohan Browning, Olympic sprinter 2020 Tokyo Olympics
 Phoebe Litchfield, Australian women's cricketer

Rhodes Scholars
 1904 Wilfred Barton
 1905 Percival Halse Rogers
 1906 Mungo L. McCallum
 1908 Stanley Castlehow (for Queensland)
 1910 John R. Hooten
 1911 Harold K. Denham (for Queensland)
 1921 Tom Lawton, Snr (for Queensland)
 1922 Arthur C. Wallace
 1928 Richard Ashburner
 1929 Ian M. Edwards
 1930 Norman K. Lamport
 1934 Hugh C. Barry
 1947 David R. Stewart
 1949 Robert C. Robertson-Cuninghame
 1984 Ian M. Jackman
 1991 Angus Taylor
 2004 Alexander W. Cameron
 2004 Stephanie M. Topp

References

Further reading
 
 St Andrew's College Annual Report & Magazine for 2005

External links
 Official website

Presbyterian Church of Australia
Residential colleges of the University of Sydney
1867 establishments in Australia
Educational institutions established in 1867